The Gulf and Ship Island Railroad (G&SI) was constructed in the state of Mississippi, USA, at the turn of the 20th century to open a vast expanse of southern yellow pine forests for commercial harvest. In spite of economic uncertainty, entrepreneurs William H. Hardy and Joseph T. Jones successfully completed railroad construction. The railroad resulted in the development of a seaport and expansion of cities along its route.

Railroad charter 
The Gulf and Ship Island Railroad (G&SIRR) was developed under three charters provided by the Mississippi State Legislature.  The first charter was given in 1850, followed by a second in 1856. The second charter expired and lapsed for 31 years, because of the American Civil War and Reconstruction. The state legislature validated a third charter in 1887.

William H. Hardy 
In 1887, William H. Hardy accepted the presidency of the Gulf and Ship Island Railroad with the support of longtime railroad financiers William Clark Falkner and William Wirt Adams. The railroad was to be constructed as standard gauge, with a terminus at some point along the Gulf of Mexico in Mississippi. Hardy envisioned a railroad that would run from the Gulf Coast, north through Mississippi, to Jackson, Tennessee. As time passed, Hardy made several important revisions to the lay of the railroad line. He changed the route to cross his New Orleans and Northeastern Railroad at a point he named Hattiesburg, in honor of his wife (Hattie Lott Hardy). Being the original county seat for Harrison County, Mississippi City was preferred as the Gulf terminus for the G&SIRR, but Hardy determined that the town was too far east of the natural deep-water harbor protected by Ship Island and proposed a new city, Gulfport, as the revised railroad terminal.

Railroad construction begins 
Until the end of 1888, construction on the G&SIRR was accomplished using prisoners contracted through the Mississippi State Penitentiary convict-lease system. However, the convict lease was terminated when a state commission found abuse of the prison workers. Construction of the railroad continued under the supervision of The Union Investment Company, which fell into bankruptcy, and the Tobey Construction Company. But the railroad remained unfinished. W. H. Hardy worked diligently to seek out investors and financiers in the northern and western U.S., as well as in Europe, to bring new capital to the project, but Reconstruction Era economics compromised his efforts. Hardy's attempts to secure financing could not stop a widespread panic, causing the G&SIRR to fall into receivership in 1896.

Joseph T. Jones 

By the late 1800s, Joseph T. Jones had made a fortune in oil wells and oil pipelines in Pennsylvania and West Virginia. He heard of the potential for investment in the bankrupt railroad being constructed in Mississippi that included  of timberland, as well as another  of timberland available for harvest.

Jones, along with other investors, formed the Bradford Construction Company to buy the bankrupt railroad and pursue the investment opportunity in Mississippi. The longest section of the G&SIRR was completed by the Bradford Construction Company of Pennsylvania, under the leadership and financing of J.T. Jones. In 1901, Jones bought out his partners, and the Bradford Construction Company merged with the Gulf and Ship Island Railroad Company.
In need of a residence on the Gulf Coast, Jones had the Great Southern Hotel constructed at Gulfport. Nearby, a new office building was constructed for the Gulf and Ship Island Railroad Company.

Although the G&SIRR Company changed hands to Joseph T. Jones, W.H. Hardy remained involved as a board member until 1899. In 1895, Hardy was elected to the Mississippi State Legislature which kept him at the State Capital in Jackson, precluding his involvement with the railroad.

Railroad location 
On January 1, 1897, the railroad was completed between Gulfport and Hattiesburg. Another 3.5 years passed before the railroad opened between Hattiesburg and Jackson (July 4, 1900). The Gulf and Ship Island Railroad operated exclusively in the State of Mississippi.
The primary rail line began at Gulfport and extended northward to Jackson, Mississippi, with branch lines connected to the towns of Maxie, Mendenhall, and Laurel. Additional rail lines extended to the towns of Pontotoc and Ripley and into territory adjacent to the Tennessee River in the northeastern portion of Mississippi.
The G&SIRR opened a vast resource of southern yellow pines for harvest. Logging and lumber companies sprang up in towns along the rail line and used the railroad to transport logs to sawmills and lumber to markets. In 1907 alone, about 800 million board feet of southern yellow pine lumber was transported on the G&SIRR.

Exports and imports 
The G&SIRR Company controlled a 6-mile (9.7-km) long channel in the Gulf of Mexico that connected the mainland to Ship Island. Dredging of a shipping channel was completed by the S.S. Bullis Company in 1902; it connected Ship Island and the main railroad terminal at Gulfport.  The G&SIRR greatly facilitated the development of the shipping port. Between 1903 and 1907, more than a billion board feet of timber was shipped out of Gulfport. In 1908, the first shipment of cotton was exported by steamship. During the early years after port development, some of the items imported through Gulfport included phosphates, iron pyrite, creosote oil, naval stores and mahogany. From 1910 through 1913, the Port of Gulfport shipped and exported more timber than any other port in the world.

The state of Mississippi derived substantial benefits from the G&SIRR. The railroad facilitated the development of towns along its route, gave rise to a booming timber industry, resulted in the creation of the city of Gulfport, and brought about construction of a deep-water seaport. Beginning in 1924, the G&SIRR operated as a subsidiary of the Illinois Central Railroad but lost its independent identity in 1946.

See also

Wiggins Depot (Mississippi): a G&SI station
Finkbine-Guild Lumber Company

References 

Defunct Mississippi railroads
Former Class I railroads in the United States
Gulfport, Mississippi
Harrison County, Mississippi
History of Mississippi
Illinois Central Railroad
Railway companies established in 1850
Railway companies disestablished in 1946
American companies established in 1850